Deh Now-e Yek (also Romanized as Deh Now-e Yek; also known as Deh-e Now, Deh Now, and Dehnow) is a village in Mashiz Rural District, in the Central District of Bardsir County, Kerman Province, Iran. At the 2006 census, its population was 37, in 6 families.

References 

Populated places in Bardsir County